Salvatore Scibona (born 1975) is an American novelist. He has won awards for both his novels and short stories, and was selected in 2010 as one of The New Yorker's "20 under 40" Fiction Writers to Watch. His work has been published in ten languages. In 2021 he was awarded the $200,000 Mildred and Harold Strauss Living award from the American Academy of Arts and Letter for his novel The Volunteer. In its citation the Academy wrote, "Salvatore Scibona’s work is grand, tragic, epic. His novel The Volunteer, about war, masculinity, abandonment, and grimly executed grace, is an intricate masterpiece of plot, scene, and troubled character. In language both meticulous and extravagant, Scibona brings to the American novel a mythic fury, a fresh greatness."

Early life and education
Salvatore Scibona was born in 1975 in Cleveland, Ohio. 

He graduated from St. John's College in 1997 and published an essay about his experience there in The New Yorker. Scibona earned an M.F.A. in 1999 at the Iowa Writer's Workshop at the University of Iowa.  The following year he was awarded a Fulbright Fellowship, using it to travel to Italy for research for his first novel, published as The End (2008), which was a finalist for the National Book Award and winner of the Young Lions Fiction Award from the New York Public Library.

Career
Scibona has written novels, essays, and short stories, the last published in Threepenny Review, Best New American Voices 2004, The Pushcart Book of Short Stories: The Best Stories from a Quarter-Century of the Pushcart Prize, Harper's and The New Yorker.

His work has been recognized by major awards including the Whiting Writers Award and the Guggenheim Fellowship. He was named one of the "20 under 40" writers by The New Yorker in 2010.

From 2004 through 2013 he administered the writing fellowship at the Fine Arts Work Center in Provincetown, Massachusetts. From 2013 to 2016, he taught at Wesleyan University. Since 2017, he has directed the Dorothy and Lewis B. Cullman Center for Scholars and Writers at the New York Public Library.

Works

Novels

Short Stories
 "The Kid", The New Yorker, June 14, 2010
 "The Woman Who Lived In The House", A Public Space, Summer 2010
 "The Hidden Person", Harper's Magazine, January 2013
 "The Tremendous Machine", Harper's Magazine, September 2015
 "Do Not Stop", The New Yorker, January 21, 2019

Essays
 "Think Like A Fish" The New York Times June 27, 2009
 "Where I Learned to Read", The New Yorker, June 13, 2011

Anthologies

Awards
 2020, Ohioana Book Award in fiction for The Volunteer
 2010, selected by The New Yorker for "20 under 40: Fiction Writers to Watch"
 2010 Guggenheim Fellowship
 2009 Whiting Award
 2009 Norman Mailer Cape Cod Writing Award 
 2008 National Book Award finalist, for The End
 2009 Young Lions Fiction Award from the New York Public Library

References

External links
Profile at The Whiting Foundation
Interview: "Salvatore Scibona Brings Us to The End", Meeting House: A Journal of New England Literature and Arts, 28 Jul 2008
Salvatore Scibona, "The End website", Graywolf Press
"Interview with Salvatore Scibona, The End", Fiction Writers Review
Antonio Pagliaro interviews Salvatore Scibona (in Italian) 21 arte cultura società magazine, 2011

21st-century American novelists
American male novelists
Novelists from Ohio
Novelists from Massachusetts
Living people
1975 births
St. John's College (Annapolis/Santa Fe) alumni
21st-century American male writers